Fajozes is a civil parish in the municipality of Vila do Conde, Portugal. The population in 2011 was 1,425, in an area of 5.96 km².

References

Freguesias of Vila do Conde